is the most important city square in Montevideo, Uruguay, laid out in the 19th century in the area occupied by the Citadel of Montevideo. In its center is a monument to General José Gervasio Artigas, and below it, his mausoleum. 

Located in barrio Centro, on its border with the Ciudad Vieja, the square has been used for numerous political demonstrations and official public events. Prominent buildings facing the square include the Palacio Salvo, Solís Theatre, Estévez Palace, and Executive Tower.

History 
After the demolition of the fortifications of the colonial city, after affirming independence, the walled city became an open city. For this reason, in 1837 the Ciudad Nueva ("New City") was designed, in which the architect Carlo Zucchi drew Independence Square, inspired by the Rue de Rivoli in Paris. During the 19th century, the square was positioned as a center of importance for the country, since the Estévez Palace, seat of the Uruguayan Government was erected there.

At the beginning of the 20th century, French landscape architect Carlos Thays was in charge of the landscape design of the space, which until then had remained completely empty. Thays designed four French-inspired flower beds with fountains and greenery, and planted his signature palm trees. In 1923, during the administration of President Baltasar Brum, a monument to General José Gervasio Artigas was inaugurated, which consists of a 17-meter bronze equestrian statue with a granite base sculpted by Angelo Zanelli.

On September 27, 1974, during the civil-military dictatorship, the creation of an underground mausoleum under the square for the remains of Artigas was approved. These had remained in the National Pantheon of the Central Cemetery since 1972, when they arrived in Uruguay from Paraguay –place of his death in 1850–. The mausoleum, which was the work of the architects Lucas Ríos Demalde and Alejandro Morón, consists of two wide granite stairs that go down to an underground room where the urn with the remains of José Artigas was installed; a granite mastaba behind the monument located above the urn functions as a skylight. It was finally inaugurated and opened to the public on June 19, 1977, the anniversary of his birth, and a national holiday in Uruguay. The site has a permanent honor guard from its body of soldiers (Cuerpo de Blandengues), the first in which Artigas served. The changing of the guard is a major ceremony and tourist attraction.

Geography 
Surrounding the square are the Gateway of the Citadel and the beginning of the Peatonal Sarandí pedestrian street to the west, and the Palacio Salvo to the east. Also on the east is the beginning of 18 de Julio Avenue, the most important road in the city. To the south west is the Solís Theatre, while the Executive Tower and the Estévez Palace, both seats of the Executive Branch, are to the south, and the Radisson Montevideo Victoria Plaza is to the north.

Events
Since 2010, the square has been used for presidential inaugurations for the transfer of the presidential sash, because it is a nerve center of the city and is located in front of the Executive Tower, the president's workplace. However, the swearing in of both the President and the Vice President takes place in the Legislative Palace.
In May and June 2009 an exhibition of the "United Buddy Bears" was held in the square, for the second on the American continent.

In popular culture 

 The square is featured in the 2009 short film Ataque de pánico!, directed by Fede Álvarez, where square and a large part of the city of Montevideo is destroyed by giant robots and spacecraft.
 In 2010 the square was a filming location for a Lipton commercial, starring Hugh Jackman, where dance group performed a musical choreography in front of the Gateway of the Citadel and other parts of the Ciudad Vieja.
 Plaza Independencia appears in a 2014 Ministry of Transport and Public Works commercial to raise awareness about road safety. The announcement indicates that during 2013 in Uruguay more people died in traffic accidents than in the 2010 earthquake in Chile, and features the square being destroyed by a large earthquake.
 In 2019 the space was used to shoot the Netflix series, Conquest, produced by Keanu Reeves. The benches, bushes and traffic signs had to be removed and the adjoining streets painted, while the production lasted, which fenced off the perimeter of the square for several days.

See also
List of city squares in Montevideo

References

External links

Squares in Montevideo
Ciudad Vieja, Montevideo